Marcin Brzeziński (born 6 January 1984) is a Polish rower.  He is the reigning world champion in the men's coxless four won at the 2019 World Rowing Championships. He competed at the 2008 and 2012 Summer Olympics in the men's eight, finishing in 5th and 7th respectively.

References

External links
 

1984 births
Living people
Polish male rowers
Olympic rowers of Poland
Rowers at the 2008 Summer Olympics
Rowers at the 2012 Summer Olympics
Rowers at the 2016 Summer Olympics
Rowers from Warsaw
World Rowing Championships medalists for Poland
Rowers at the 2020 Summer Olympics
21st-century Polish people